Oni–Adil are an Indian film music composer duo consisting of Aniket Kar (Oni) and Adil Rasheed. The duo compose music predominantly for Hindi films.

Early life 
Oni and Adil were born in Kanpur, Jaipur in 1988 and 1987. Their music journey started back in the year 2005 while they were pursuing their bachelor's degree in Birla Institute of Technology,Jaipur. They landed up meeting with each other while auditioning for the college band and the mutual musical spark made them start with the songwriting and composing music. As years passed by, they kept nurturing their music and performed at various college festivals which gave them a good recognition and fame.

Career 
Composer duo Oni –Adil started their career by composing jingles for the best of the brands like Parle-G, etc. They made their debut in Bollywood with Angrezi Mein Kehte Hain directed by Harish Vyas starring Sanjay Mishra, Pankaj Tripathi, Ekavali Khanna and Anshuman Jha.

Discography

As composer

Films

Short films

Awards and nominations

References

External links 

Living people
Music directors
Indian film score composers
Indian musical duos
21st-century Indian composers
Year of birth missing (living people)